Lepidopsocidae are an insect family of bark lice belonging to the suborder Trogiomorpha. Colloquially, Lepidopsocidae are referred to as the Scaly-winged Barklice. There are more than 220 species described worldwide. Phylogenetic DNA analysis of relationships between families in Trogiomorpha propose that Lepidopsocidae is monophyletic, meaning that the taxa within all share a common ancestor. This is supported morphologically by the presence of scales and setae covering the body and forewings of Lepodopsocids. Sister families of Lepidoposcidae include Trogiidae and Psoquillidae.

Lepidopsocidae was described by Gunther Enderlein in The Scaly Winged Copeognatha (Monograph of the Amphientomidae, Lepidopsocidae, and Lepidillidae in relation to their Morphology and Taxonomy), published in 1906. Subfamilies of Lepidopsocidae include:
 Echinopsocinae Enderlein, 1906
 Lepidopsocinae Enderlein, 1903
 Lepolepidinae
 Parasoinae Mockford, 2005
 Perientominae Enderlein, 1903
 Thylacellinae Roesler, 1944

Genera
These 21 genera belong to the family Lepidopsocidae:

 Cyptophania Banks, 1931
 Echinopsocus Enderlein, 1903
 Echmepteryx Aaron, 1886
 Illepidopsocus Li, 1994
 Lepidopsocus Enderlein, 1903
 Lepolepis Enderlein, 1906
 Neolepidopsocus Li, 1992
 Neolepolepis Mockford, 1993
 Nepticulomima Enderlein, 1906
 Notolepium Enderlein, 1910
 Papuapsocus Mockford, 2005
 Parasoa Thornton, 1962
 Perientomum Hagen, 1865
 Proentomum Badonnel, 1949
 Pseudothylacus Li, 2002
 Pteroxanium Enderlein, 1922
 Scolopama Enderlein, 1906
 Soa Enderlein, 1904
 Thylacella Enderlein, 1911
 † Lepium Enderlein, 1906
 † Thylax Hagen, 1866

References

Psocoptera families
Trogiomorpha